Ollie Callan (born 20 July 2000 in England) is an English-born, Australian rugby union player who plays for the  in Global Rapid Rugby and the Super Rugby AU competition. His playing position is flanker. He was named in the Force squad for the Global Rapid Rugby competition in 2020.

Reference list

External links
Rugby.com.au profile
itsrugby.co.uk profile

2000 births
Australian rugby union players
Living people
Rugby union flankers
Western Force players
Rugby union players from London